
The  or passage of arms was a type of chivalric hastilude that evolved in the late 14th century and remained popular through the 15th century. It involved a knight or group of knights ( or "holders") who would stake out a traveled spot, such as a bridge or city gate, and let it be known that any other knight who wished to pass ( or "comers") must first fight, or be disgraced. If a traveling venan did not have weapons or horse to meet the challenge, one might be provided, and if the venan chose not to fight, he would leave his spurs behind as a sign of humiliation. If a lady passed unescorted, she would leave behind a glove or scarf, to be rescued and returned to her by a future knight who passed that way.

The origins of  can be found in a number of factors. During the 14th and 15th centuries the chivalric idea of a noble knight clashed with new more deadly forms of warfare, as seen during the Hundred Years' War, when peasants armed with longbows could damage and wound knights anonymously from a distance, breaking traditional rules of chivalry; and cavalry charges could be broken by pikemen formations introduced by the Swiss.

At the same time, the noble classes began to differentiate themselves, in many ways, including through reading courtly literature such as the very popular chivalric romances of the 12th century. For the noble classes the line between reality and fiction blurred, the deeds they read about were real, while their deeds in reality were often deadly, if not comical, re-enactments of those they read about.

There are many thousands of accounts of  during this period. This road was used by pilgrims from all over Europe on the way to shrine at Santiago de Compostela. After 166 battles, de Quiñones and his men were so injured they could not continue and declared the mission complete. Suero de Quiñones became legendary, and was mentioned in Don Quixote, the 1605 satire on the notion of romantic chivalry out of touch with reality.

List of pas d'armes
 (1428)
Suero de Quiñones'  (Órbigo, 1434)
 (Dijon, 1443)
 (1445)
 (around 1445)
 (Nancy, 1445)
 (1446)
 (Saint-Omer, 1449)
 (1449)
 (Chalon-sur-Saône, 1449–1450)
 (Lille, 1454)
 (1455)
 (1463)
 (Bruges, (1463)
, (Bruges, 1468)
 (Ghent, 1470)

See also
 Tournament (medieval)
 Combat of the Thirty
 Black Knight (Monty Python)
 Knights who say Ni

Footnotes

Sources
Odile Blanc, Les stratégies de la parure dans le divertissement chevaleresque. In: Communications, 46, 1987. Parure pudeur étiquette, sous la direction de Olivier Burgelin, Philippe Perrot et Marie-Thérèse Basse. pp. 49–65. .
 Sébastien Nadot, Joutes, emprises et pas d'armes en Bourgogne, Castille et France, 1428–1470, thèse de doctorat soutenue à l'EHESS Paris en avril 2009.
 Sébastien Nadot, Rompez les lances ! Chevaliers et tournois au Moyen Age, Editions autrement, Paris, 2010.
Riquer, Martín de (1967). Caballeros andantes españoles. Madrid: Editorial Espasa-Calpe.

Further reading

External links
Brian R. Price (1996), What is Pas d'Armes?
Academy of European Medieval Martial Arts (AEMMA), Toronto, Canada.

 
Chivalry
15th century in Europe